Zbigniew Dębski (29 November 1922 in Łasin – 10 April 2010) was a Polish military personal and co-founder of the Union of Warsaw Insurgents.

He died in the 2010 Polish Air Force Tu-154 crash near Smolensk on 10 April 2010. He was posthumously awarded the Order of Polonia Restituta.

Awards
 Silver Cross of the Virtuti Militari
  Commander's Cross with Star of the Order of Polonia Restituta
 3rd award of the Cross of Valour

References

1922 births
2010 deaths
Home Army members
Warsaw Uprising insurgents
Burials at Powązki Military Cemetery
Recipients of the Silver Cross of the Virtuti Militari
Recipients of the Cross of Valour (Poland)
Commanders with Star of the Order of Polonia Restituta
Victims of the Smolensk air disaster